Miami Executive Airport, formerly known until 2014 as Kendall-Tamiami Executive Airport,  is a public airport in unincorporated Miami-Dade County, Florida,  southwest of Downtown Miami. It is operated by the Miami-Dade Aviation Department.

The airport opened on November 18, 1967, replacing Tamiami Airport, next to the Tamiami Trail. Growth of the surrounding area and the nearby flight path to Miami International Airport had forced the move to the southwest, near the community of Kendall.  Florida International University is now on the site of the old Tamiami Airport. Kendall-Tamiami airport is owned and operated by the Miami-Dade Aviation Department. 450 aircraft are based there, mostly single-engine light aircraft.

The airport is a port of entry with U.S. Customs personnel on hand, although it is not certified for airline use. In recent years it has become popular as a corporate aviation terminal.

History
The airport opened in 1967, replacing an eponymous airfield to the north which closed because of its proximity to Miami International. When built, the airport also had a seaplane runway which is still visible on the north side of the airfield. The airport was renamed from Kendall-Tamiami Executive Airport to Miami Executive Airport on October 7, 2014, by the Miami-Dade County Commission. All secondary airports in Miami-Dade County were rebranded to include the name "Miami".

Facilities
 9L/27R: 5,003 x 150 ft (1,525 x 46 m)
 9R/27L: 5,999 x 150 ft (1,830 x 46 m)
 13/31: 4,001 x 150 ft (1,220 x 46 m)

In the year ending 17 May 2011 the airport had 193,815 aircraft operations, average 531 per day: 99% general aviation, 1% air taxi and <1% military. 445 aircraft are based at the airport: 69% single-engine, 20% multi-engine, 8% helicopter and 3% jet.

Services
It is the main airbase of the Miami-Dade Police Aviation Unit and houses the Miami-Dade College's aviation programs. The Wings Over Miami aviation museum is also at the field.

The airport is home to Tamiami Composite Squadron (SER-FL-355), a local squadron of the Civil Air Patrol (United States Air Force Auxiliary), whose mission includes aerial and ground search and rescue.

Fire protection at the airport is provided by Miami-Dade Fire Rescue Department Station 24.

Runway 9R/27L extension
A request for $1-million was added to the 2007 Miami-Dade Federal Legislative Package to extend runway 9R/27L 550 feet to the east and 1,798 feet to the west to "...allow aircraft to increase their fuel and/or cargo load and ... allow for the accommodation of nearly 100 percent of midsize jet aircraft under wet runway conditions."

Ohio University all-season test facility
Ohio University Avionics Engineering Center operates a controversial avionics test facility on Runway 9L, the north runway at Miami Executive Airport. This facility was used in 2007–8 to certify the steep approach landing system on the Embraer ERJ-170 and ERJ-190 transport category jet airliners. Embraer conducted this testing and software development in order to meet stringent requirements and approval to land at London City Airport, an airport in central London, England. The test facility was under intense scrutiny due to numerous controversial test flights involving the challenging development and modifications to the fly-by-wire flight control systems in these advanced aircraft.

Testing of experimental aircraft over congested areas such as Kendall is prohibited by the FAA. Media coverage in the Miami Herald  and Kendall Gazette  about the safety issues led the Kendall Federation of Homeowners Associations to call for a meeting to discuss the problem.

Incidents and accidents 
 On February 11, 2015, a Beechcraft 1900C operated by Aeropanamericano, C.A., experienced an engine failure after takeoff from Miami Executive Airport and attempted to return but crashed, killing all four people on board.

References

External links 

 Miami Executive Airport, official site
  brochure from CFASPP
 
 

Airports in Miami-Dade County, Florida
1967 establishments in Florida
Airports established in 1967